The UK Rock & Metal Singles Chart is a record chart which ranks the best-selling rock and heavy metal songs in the United Kingdom. Compiled and published by the Official Charts Company, the data is based on each track's weekly physical sales, digital downloads and streams. In 1997, there were 21 singles that topped the 52 published charts. The first number-one single of the year was "In the Meantime", the debut single by alternative rock band Spacehog, which spent the first three weeks of the year at number one. The final number-one single of the year was "The Memory Remains" by American heavy metal band Metallica.

The most successful song on the UK Rock & Metal Singles Chart in 1997 was "The Memory Remains" by Metallica, which spent the last six weeks of the year at number one. Reef's "Come Back Brighter" was number one for five weeks, while the band also spent two weeks atop the chart with "Yer Old". Green Day's "Hitchin' a Ride" also spent five weeks at number one, while Jon Bon Jovi was number one for five weeks with "Midnight in Chelsea" (three weeks) and "Queen of New Orleans" (two weeks). Marilyn Manson's "Tourniquet" spent three weeks at number one and one week with "The Beautiful People", while "In the Meantime" by Spacehog, "Song 2" by Blur and "Monkey Wrench" by Foo Fighters were all number one for three weeks. Five singles – "Swallowed" by Bush, "Falling in Love (Is Hard on the Knees)" by Aerosmith, "Freak" by Silverchair, "Afraid" by Mötley Crüe and "Anthem" by The Wildhearts – spent two weeks each at number one on the chart during 1997.

Chart history

See also
1997 in British music
List of UK Rock & Metal Albums Chart number ones of 1997

References

External links
Official UK Rock & Metal Singles Chart Top 40 at the Official Charts Company
The Official UK Top 40 Rock Singles at BBC Radio 1

1997 in British music
United Kingdom Rock and Metal Singles
1997